The National Sprint is a greyhound racing competition held annually at Nottingham Greyhound Stadium.

It was inaugurated in 1953 at Clapton Stadium. Following the closure of Clapton in 1974 the competition briefly switched to Portsmouth Stadium before it found a home at Harringay Stadium.

When Harringay closed down in 1987 the event was not held again until Nottingham decided to resurrect the competition in 1990.

Past winners

Venues 
 1953–1973 (Clapton 400 yards)		
 1974–1976 (Portsmouth 435 metres)		 
 1977–1984 (Harringay 414 metres)
 1985–1987 (Harringay 272 metres)
 1982, 1988–1989 (Not run)	
 1990–1998 (Nottingham 310 metres)
 1999–2002 (Nottingham 300 metres)
 2003–2004 (Nottingham 295 metres)
 2005–present (Nottingham 305 metres)

Sponsors
1994–2001 (Peter Derrick bookmakers)
2002–2003 (William Hill)
2005–2017 (Stadium Bookmakers)
2018–2019 (Local Parking Security Ltd)
2020–2020 (Racing Post GTV)
2021–present (Arena Racing Company)

References

Greyhound racing competitions in the United Kingdom
Sport in Nottingham
Recurring sporting events established in 1953
Greyhound racing in London